Vasey's Paradise, also stylized as Vaseys Paradise, is an oasis approximately  below the Mile 30 Sand Bar on the Colorado River within Grand Canyon National Park, in Coconino County, Arizona, United States.

Near the bottom of the canyon, in an otherwise semi-desert region, it consists of several waterfalls created by groundwater emanating from the upper cliff faces, which supports a localized area of dense vegetation. Vasey's Paradise is a highly sensitive environment which can only be accessed from the river. It is notable for being one of only two known natural habitats of the Kanab ambersnail (Oxyloma haydeni kanabense), a federally listed critically endangered species of land snail.

External links 
 
  Brian D. Collins and Robert Kayen Applicability of Terrestrial LIDAR Scanning for Scientific Studies in Grand Canyon National Park, Arizona – U.S. Geological Survey, Menlo Park, California Open File Report 2006–1198 U.S. Department of the Interior U.S. Geological Survey. Page 21 (PDF). Accessed November 2006.
 Image gallery of Vaseys Paradise zionnational-park.com. Accessed November 2006.

Landmarks in Arizona
Grand Canyon
Bodies of water of Coconino County, Arizona
Oases of Arizona